8 Out of 10 Cats Does Countdown is a British comedy panel show hosted by Jimmy Carr. It is a crossover of 8 Out of 10 Cats and game show Countdown. The show follows the format of Countdown, but with hosts and contestants from 8 Out of 10 Cats, and an emphasis on the humour seen on 8 Out of 10 Cats. All episodes are approximately 45 minutes long, and usually feature team captains Sean Lock and Jon Richardson.

Series overview

Episodes

Legend 
 – indicates Sean's/Guest's team won.
 – indicates Jon's team won.
 – indicates the game ended in a draw.
 TC – a guest team captain sitting in for Sean or Jon

Original episodes (2012)

Series 1 (2013)

Series 2 (2013)

Series 3 (2014)

Series 4 (2014)

Series 5 (2014)

Series 6 (2014–15)

Series 7 (2015)

Series 8 (2015–16)

Series 9 (2016)

Series 10 (2016)

Series 11 (2016) 
Lock and Richardson never appeared together in this series.

Series 12 (2016–17)

Series 13 (2017)

Series 14 (2017)

Series 15 (2017–18)

Series 16 (2018)

Series 17 (2018–19)

Series 18 (2019)

Series 19 (2020)

Series 20 (2020) 
This series is composed of unaired episodes as a result of the COVID-19 pandemic. The first two episodes were recorded in late 2019 to accommodate Rachel Riley's maternity leave, made obvious by the fact she still appears 8-months pregnant in these episodes; the third episode was originally filmed in early 2019 as references were made to Richard Ayoade's role in the "recent" film The Lego Movie 2: The Second Part; and the fourth and fifth episodes were Best Bits specials that were originally assembled in 2018. The Christmas Special was also filmed in 2019, prior to Riley's pregnancy.

Series 21 (2021) 
The last series broadcast prior to Sean Lock's death in 2021. The first three episodes were shot in 2019.

Series 22 (2022)

Series 23 (2022)

Series 24 (2023)

See also 
 List of 8 Out of 10 Cats episodes

Notes

Episode notes

Viewer notes

References

External links 
 List of 
 
 

Lists of British comedy television series episodes
Lists of British non-fiction television series episodes